David Leo O'Gorman (c. 1865–1945) was an Irish politician. He was an unsuccessful candidate at the 1923 general election. He was first elected to Dáil Éireann at the June 1927 general election as a Farmers' Party Teachta Dála (TD) for the Cork East constituency. He lost his seat at the September 1927 general election.

O'Gorman was a native of Youghal. At the time of his election as a TD, he was a member of the governing body of University College Cork and chairman of Cork County Council. His son-in-law was Irish Parliamentary Party MP Thomas Lundon.

In 1933, O'Gorman was vice-chairman of Cork County Council and lived at Janeville, Fermoy, County Cork.

In April 1941, he was chairman of Cork County Council.

References

1865 births
1945 deaths
Farmers' Party (Ireland) TDs
Members of the 5th Dáil
Politicians from County Cork
People from Fermoy
People associated with University College Cork